Las Palmas District is a district (distrito) of Veraguas Province in Panama. The population according to the 2000 census was 17,924; the latest official estimate (for 2019) is 18,493. The district covers a total area of 1,015 km². The capital lies at the town of Las Palmas.

Administrative divisions
Las Palmas District is divided administratively into the following corregimientos:

Las Palmas
Cerro de Casa
Corozal
El María
El Prado
El Rincón
Lolá
Pixvae
Puerto Vidal
Zapotillo
San Martín de Porres
Viguí
Manuel Encarnación Amador Terreros (created in 2012)

References

Districts of Panama
Veraguas Province